Michel Tony-Révillon (24 April 1891 in Paris – 11 January 1957) was a French politician. He represented the Radical Party in the Chamber of Deputies from 1932 to 1935, in the Senate from 1935 to 1940, in the Constituent Assembly elected in 1945, in the Constituent Assembly elected in 1946 and in the National Assembly from 1946 to 1957. He was Minister of National Education in 1948.

References

1891 births
1957 deaths
Politicians from Paris
Radical Party (France) politicians
French Ministers of National Education
Members of the 15th Chamber of Deputies of the French Third Republic
French Senators of the Third Republic
Senators of Ain
Members of the Constituent Assembly of France (1945)
Members of the Constituent Assembly of France (1946)
Deputies of the 1st National Assembly of the French Fourth Republic
Deputies of the 2nd National Assembly of the French Fourth Republic
Deputies of the 3rd National Assembly of the French Fourth Republic